Therese Giehse (6 March 1898 – 3 March 1975), born Therese Gift, was a German actress. Born in Munich to German-Jewish parents, she first appeared on the stage in 1920. She became a major star on stage, in films, and in political cabaret. In the late 1920s through 1933, she was a leading actress at the Munich Kammerspiele.

Early career

When the Nazis came to power in 1933, Giehse left Germany for Zürich, Switzerland, where she continued to act in exile, playing leading roles in Zürich, including in Erika Mann's acclaimed political cabaret,  (which was itself also an exile, having been transported from Munich to Zürich in 1933 as well).

On 20 May 1936, she married the homosexual English writer John Hampson to obtain a British passport and avoid capture by the Nazis. She returned to Germany after World War II, and performed in theaters on both sides of the Iron Curtain, but mostly in her native Bavaria, until her death on 3 March 1975, three days before her 77th birthday.

With Bertolt Brecht
In exile, Giehse played the first Mother Courage in the world premiere of Bertolt Brecht's play Mother Courage and Her Children, in 1941 at the Schauspielhaus Zürich.

After the war, Giehse returned to Munich and to the Munich Kammerspiele, where, in 1950, she again played the role of Mother Courage, this time directed by Brecht himself. This production became documented as the second "Model production" of Brecht's play (the first "Model production" had been performed by Brecht's wife, Helene Weigel in 1949 in Berlin). Giehse and Brecht would often converse in their strong Bavarian (southern German) dialect during rehearsals, making Brecht's wife jealous of their kindred spirit.

In the 1950s, Giehse played several roles as a member of Brecht's theatre, the Berliner Ensemble. In the mid-1970s, she returned to the Berliner Ensemble to perform several Brecht Evenings of the poems, plays, and writings of her lifelong friend and colleague. As a member of the Berliner Ensemble and collaborator with Brecht, she was a much-sought-after interpreter of his work and recordings of her reciting and singing his work appeared on records in both East and West Germany.

Other roles
Throughout the 1950s and 1960s, Giehse continued to perform many lead roles in various theaters in Germany, often using her considerable comic skills to play character roles, as well as great dramatic roles, such as the leads in several landmark productions by Friedrich Dürrenmatt, the world premiere of The Visit in 1956, and The Physicists in 1962. She later worked with Peter Stein's renowned  in Berlin.

She also appeared in over 20 films and a number of television productions.
In 1988, a commemorative stamp was printed in her honor as part of the Women in German history series. In the same year a commemorative exhibition took place at the Deutsches Theatermuseum in Munich

Partial filmography

 The Foreign Legionnaire (1928) - Die Mutter
 The Love Express (1931) - Frau Mayer
 Peter Voss, Thief of Millions (1932) - Putzfrau
 Nacht der Versuchung (1932)
 The Bartered Bride (1932, directed by Max Ophüls) - Photo Concession Barker (uncredited)
 Die Zwei vom Südexpress (1932) - Frau Brennecke
 Der Meisterdetektiv (1933) - Frl. Holzapfel
 Rund um eine Million (1933) - Melanies Mutter
 Die mißbrauchten Liebesbriefe (1940) - Marie
 Das Gespensterhaus (1942) - Kathri
 Menschen, die vorüberziehen (1943) - Boschka
 The Last Chance (1945) - Frau Wittels
 The Mark of Cain (1947) - Sister Seraphine
 Anna Karenina (1948) - Marietta
 No Greater Love (1952) - Frau im Abteil
 Father Needs a Wife (1952) - Frau Nickel
 Must We Get Divorced? (1953) - Frau Holzer
 Children, Mother, and the General (1955) - Elfriede Bergmann
 Roman einer Siebzehnjährigen (1955) - Anna Hoffmann
 Holiday in Tyrol (1956) - Mutter Lindner, Witwe
 Der 10. Mai (1957) - Ida Herz
 Mädchen in Uniform (1958) - Headmistress
  (1958) - Antonida
 Storm in a Water Glass (1960) - Frau Vogel
 Lacombe, Lucien (1974, directed by Louis Malle) - Bella Horn
 Black Moon (1975, directed by Louis Malle, dedicated to her) - Old Lady (final film role)

References

External links

 
 Portrait of Giehse by Thomas Staedeli
  Biography, steffi-line.de
  Biography, dhm.de 

1898 births
1975 deaths
19th-century German Jews
20th-century German actresses
20th-century German LGBT people
Actresses from Munich
Best Actress German Film Award winners
German expatriates in Switzerland
German film actresses
German lesbian actresses
German stage actresses
German television actresses
Jewish emigrants from Nazi Germany to Switzerland
Jewish emigrants from Nazi Germany to the United Kingdom
Jewish German actresses
People from the Kingdom of Bavaria
People of the German Empire
People of the Weimar Republic